WVPB may refer to:

 West Virginia Public Broadcasting, a network of radio and television stations in the state of West Virginia, United States

It may also refer to the following outlets owned by West Virginia Public Broadcasting:
 WVPB (FM), a radio station (88.5 FM) licensed to serve Charleston, West Virginia, United States
 WVPB-TV, a television station (channel 9, virtual 33) licensed to serve Huntington, West Virginia
 WVBY, a radio station (91.7 FM) licensed to serve Beckley, West Virginia, which held the call sign WVPB from 1974 to 2014